Gambaga is the capital of the East Mamprusi Municipal Assembly in the North East Region of Ghana. Once a residence of Mamprusi-kings it is still the capital of East Mamprusi Municipal Assembly, a municipality in the North East Region of Ghana. It is home to several ancient Mossi chiefs' gravsites.

From 1901 until 1957 Gambaga served as the capital of the Northern Territories of the Gold Coast, which was a British protectorate and a separate jurisdiction from the Gold Coast.

Gambaga, along with other places in Ghana, is the site of a camp for alleged witches.

References 

Populated places in the Northern Region (Ghana)